Sanath Kumar (born 12 December 1962) is a former Indian first-class cricketer and the former head coach of Assam, Karnataka and Baroda. Kumar played for Karnataka cricket team from 1985/86 to 1988/89.

Career
Kumar was a right-arm medium pace bowler who represented Karnataka cricket team in 11 first-class and 4 List A matches between the 1985/86 and 1988/89 seasons.

Kumar took up coaching in 1990 and since 1992 trained various age-group levels of Karnataka team such as under-15, under-17, under-19 and under-22. He had worked as a talent resource development officer in the KSCA Academy. He had also coached Pahang state cricket team in Malaysia in 1994.

Kumar became the coach of the Assam cricket team before the 2005/06 season. In 2009, he returned to coach his home team Karnataka. Under his coaching, Karnataka reached the final of the 2009–10 Ranji Trophy and the semifinals in the following season. He took over as the head coach of the Baroda cricket team at the start of the 2011/12 season. Baroda won the Syed Mushtaq Ali Trophy twice during his tenure. After the 2013/14 season he quit his role with Baroda, citing the need to "spend time with family" as the reason for the decision. He returned to coach Assam from the 2014/15 season.

Kumar had also served as an assistant coach of the Indian Premier League franchise Royal Challengers Bangalore.

In August 2018, he was appointed as the coach for Meghalaya cricket team.

References

External links 
 
 

1962 births
Living people
Indian cricketers
Karnataka cricketers
Indian cricket coaches
Indian Premier League coaches
Cricketers from Mysore